George Dickie  (23 Nov 1812, Aberdeen – 1882) was a Scottish botanist, who specialised in algae.

Life

He studied arts, then medicine at the Universities of Aberdeen and Edinburgh. He qualified as a doctor around 1835. In 1837 he is listed as a surgeon, living at Cherryvale in Aberdeen.

He became a lecturer on botany in King's College, Aberdeen, then University Librarian. In 1849 he was appointed the first Professor of Natural History at Queen's College, Belfast and became a Member of the Belfast Natural History Society. In 1860 he returned to Aberdeen University as Regius Professor of Botany. He was succeeded in 1877 by Prof James William Helenus Trail FRS.

Dickie worked, most importantly on the range and depth of marine algae and on cataloguing material brought back from the Challenger expedition.

Dickie was a Fellow of the Linnean Society (1863), a Fellow of the Royal Society (1881) and a Member of the Belfast Natural History Society.

In later life he lived at 16 Albyn Terrace in Aberdeen.

He died on 15 July 1882 at is buried in the churchyard of St Machar's Cathedral in Old Aberdeen. The grave lies south west of the church.

He was succeeded by Prof James W. H. Trail.

Family

He was married to Agnes Willamson Low (d.1909).

Botanical Reference

References

External links
Algaebase Bibliography.

1812 births
1882 deaths
19th-century Scottish people
19th-century British botanists
Scottish botanists
Scottish naturalists
Scientists from Aberdeen
British phycologists
Alumni of the University of Aberdeen
Alumni of the University of Edinburgh
Academics of the University of Aberdeen
Scottish scholars and academics
Academics of Queen's University Belfast
Fellows of the Royal Society
19th-century Scottish medical doctors
Scottish librarians
Scottish marine biologists
Fellows of the Linnean Society of London